Nathan Johnson is an American meteorologist serving as Director of Weather Operations for NBC Universal owned and operated stations (including Telemundo) since November 2018, a position created by NBC for Johnson. Previously he worked for WRAL-TV in Raleigh, North Carolina as a meteorologist and executive producer focusing on weather operations since 2007.  Johnson has also served meteorology lecturer at North Carolina State University since 2010.

Prior to joining WRAL, Johnson was a data services meteorologist with Baron Services in Huntsville, Alabama.  Prior to that he served as chief meteorologist at KTXS-TV in Abiliene, Texas.  Johnson earned bachelor's degrees in both meteorology and computer science from North Carolina State University.  He interned with WRAL from May 1999 - May 2000.

Certifications
 Seal of Approval for TV Weathercasting, National Weather Association
 Certified Broadcast Meteorologist. American Meteorological Society

Awards 
 2014: Regional Emmy, Weekend Newscast "Hurricane Sandy"  (National Academy of Television Arts and Sciences Mid-South Chapter)
 2013: Best weather reporting (North Carolina AP Broadcasters)
 2012: National Emmy nomination, Breaking News (National Academy of Television Arts and Sciences)
 2012: Regional Emmy, Breaking News: "Deadly Tornados"  (National Academy of Television Arts and Sciences Mid-South Chapter)
 2012: AP Award, Best Weather (North Carolina AP Broadcasters)
 2012: Regional Edward R. Murrow Award
 2012: Continuing Coverage (Radio Television Digital News Association)
 2012: Regional Emmy, Breaking News (National Academy of Television Arts and Sciences Mid-South Chapter)
 2011: Regional Emmy Nomination, Weather (National Academy of Television Arts and Sciences Mid-South Chapter), 
 2006: Best Local TV Weather Person (Abilene Reporter-News Readers’ Choice)
 2005: Best Local TV Weather Person (Abilene Reporter-News Readers’ Choice)
 2003: Best Team Coverage – 2002 Floods (Texas AP Broadcasters Division III)

References

External links
Bio on WRAL.com
 WxWorks interview with Nate Johnson

North Carolina State University alumni
American meteorologists